Marius Wolf (born 27 May 1995) is a German professional footballer who plays as a midfielder for Bundesliga club Borussia Dortmund.

Club career
Wolf is a youth exponent from 1860 Munich. He made his 2. Bundesliga debut on 26 October 2014 against Braunschweig in a 2–1 home defeat, being substituted for Valdet Rama in the 72nd minute. On 21 February 2015, Wolf scored his first professional goal in a 2–1 home win against St. Pauli, when he brought his team to a 2–0 lead assisted by Daniel Adlung. He moved to Hannover 96 on 8 January 2016.

He was loaned by Hannover to Eintracht Frankfurt in January 2017. His loan contract was extended for the 2017–18 Bundesliga season. In January 2018, Eintracht Frankfurt exercised the option to sign him permanently and he signed a contract until June 2020.

On 28 May 2018, Wolf joined Borussia Dortmund on a five-year deal for a reported fee of €5 million. On 18 September, he made his Champions League debut in a 1–0 away win over Club Brugge during the 2018–19 season.

On 2 September 2019, Wolf was loaned out to Hertha BSC for the 2019–20 season. On 2 October 2020, he joined 1. FC Köln on loan for the 2020–21 season. Wolf later returned to his parent club, Borussia Dortmund, and started playing as a full-back or wing-back.

International career
On 12 November 2015, Wolf played one match for Germany U20 in a 2–0 defeat against Italy U20 during the Four Nations Tournament.

On 17 March 2023, he received his first official call-up to the German senior national team for the friendlies against Peru and Belgium.

Career statistics

Club

Honours
Eintracht Frankfurt
DFB-Pokal: 2017–18

Borussia Dortmund
 DFL-Supercup: 2019

References

External links
 Profile at the Borussia Dortmund website
 

1995 births
Living people
People from Coburg
People from Kronach (district)
Sportspeople from Upper Franconia
German footballers
Footballers from Bavaria
Association football midfielders
Germany youth international footballers
Bundesliga players
2. Bundesliga players
Regionalliga players
TSV 1860 Munich players
TSV 1860 Munich II players
Hannover 96 players
Hannover 96 II players
Eintracht Frankfurt players
Borussia Dortmund players
Hertha BSC players
1. FC Köln players